The West End Line or New Utrecht Avenue Line was a surface transit line in Brooklyn, New York City, United States, running along New Utrecht Avenue and other streets between Coney Island and Sunset Park. Built by the Brooklyn, Bath and Coney Island Railroad as a steam line, it became a trolley line, along which elevated trains ran until the new elevated BMT West End Line opened. This route is no longer part of any bus line; its southern part (south of Bath Beach) was part of a bus route (the B64, which replaced the 86th Street Line trolleys, until 2010). In 2013, the B64 route to Coney Island was restored.

History

Steam railroad (1863–1893)
The Brooklyn, Bath and Coney Island Railroad, incorporated in 1862 with Charles Godfrey Gunther as president, opened the first part of its line, from 25th Street and Fifth Avenue to Bath Beach mainly along New Utrecht Avenue (then the Bath Plank Road), on October 9, 1863. The extension to Coney Island was opened on June 9, 1864, making it the first steam railroad to bring beachgoers from downtown Brooklyn. (The Coney Island and Brooklyn Railroad had been operating horse cars to the island since 1862.) At the Brooklyn end, the steam line ended at 36th Street and Fifth Avenue, where the BB&CI's own horse cars ran to a connection with those of the Brooklyn Central and Jamaica Railroad's Fifth Avenue Line and the Brooklyn City Railroad's Greenwood Line at 25th Street and Fifth Avenue. The odd double transfer was made necessary by the City of Brooklyn's refusal to allow the line to operate steam cars within its city limits.

The road took its common name from the area of its terminal on Coney Island, where a hotel of the same name, but unconnected to the railroad, existed. Its terminal was known as West End Terminal, a name which survived upon major rebuilding in 1919 as New West End Terminal before that name fell into disuse.

The road was reorganized in 1868, on January 22, 1879, and again on December 1, 1885, the latter time changing its name to the Brooklyn, Bath and West End Railroad, formalizing the use of West End in the line's name. Before that time, the original steam dummy cars, which consisted of a locomotive and passenger car in one railroad-coach-type frame, were replaced by conventional steam locomotives pulling unpowered coaches.

Trolley line (1893–1947)

The Atlantic Avenue Railroad gained control of the West End in January 1893, leased it on May 8, 1893, and began to electrify it immediately without the permission of the town of New Utrecht. Effective May 21, 1893, the Atlantic Avenue extended its Fifth Avenue Line (which was electrified March 14, 1893) along the West End's trackage to the Union Depot at 36th Street, where West End trains were subsequently terminated. Electric trolleys began running on the West End Line from the Union Depot to Coney Island on November 18, 1893, and soon from the 39th Street Ferry. The Nassau Electric Railroad leased the Atlantic Avenue, and thus the West End, at midnight at the end of April 4, 1896, implementing its universal five-cent fare between Downtown Brooklyn and Coney Island. In late May the 86th Street Line was placed in operation, using the West End trackage from Bath Beach to Coney Island. Some West End cars were extended over the Brooklyn Bridge to Park Row in Lower Manhattan on February 15, 1898. The Brooklyn, Bath and West End Railroad and Atlantic Avenue Railroad were consolidated into the Nassau Electric Railroad in July 1898.

The Brooklyn Rapid Transit Company (BRT) gained control of the Nassau Electric in November 1898 and leased it (and the Brooklyn Union Elevated Railroad, operator of the Fifth Avenue Elevated, among other lines) to the Brooklyn Heights Railroad on April 1, 1899. On June 4, 1899, a new switch at Bath Junction was placed in service, and the Park Row-Coney Island cars were rerouted via the Sea Beach Line; West End cars from Downtown Brooklyn continued to use the West End Line through Bath Beach.

BRT control paved the way for the line to be connected to the elevated system, and, on December 19, 1900, trolleys between 36th Street and Bath Beach were replaced with elevated trains from Park Row in Lower Manhattan; the line beyond Bath Beach to Coney Island was part of the 86th Street Line. Trains operated by third rail power over the Fifth Avenue Elevated to a ramp at 37th Street, and, from that point, trains raised trolley poles to operate using overhead wire to Bath Beach. A new bridge over Coney Island Creek was built to allow heavy elevated trains to run to Coney Island, and this service, from Park Row to Coney Island, began on July 13, 1902, for ten cents.

The Nassau Electric Railroad lease to the Brooklyn Heights Railroad was canceled on June 30, 1904, and dual operation began, where the Brooklyn Heights (later the Brooklyn Union Elevated Railroad and New York Consolidated Railroad) operated the trains to 38th Street, and the surface operation beyond to Coney Island was done by the Nassau Electric.

Elevated operations on the surface ended on June 24, 1916, when the new elevated West End Line, connecting into the Fourth Avenue Subway, opened to 18th Avenue. The line was built as part of Contract 4 of the Dual Contracts, but at the BRT's own expense. Trolleys continued to operate on the portion south of the Church Avenue Line (39th Street) until June 28, 1947.

Stations

References

Streetcar lines in Brooklyn
Brooklyn–Manhattan Transit Corporation
1863 establishments in New York (state)